Plautilla is a genus of cicadas in the family Cicadidae, found in the Neotropics. There are at least three described species in Plautilla.

Plautilla is the only genus of the tribe Plautillini.

Species
These three species belong to the genus Plautilla:
 Plautilla hammondi Distant, 1914
 Plautilla stalagmoptera Stål, 1865
 Plautilla venedictoffae Boulard, 1978

References

Further reading

 
 
 

Cicadinae
Cicadidae genera